KKEZ (94.5 MHz, "Mix 94.5") is a commercial FM radio station in Fort Dodge, Iowa. It has a hot adult contemporary radio format and is owned by Alpha Media.  The transmitter is off U.S. Route 169 at Avenue G in Fort Dodge.

History
In 1966, the station signed on as KWMT-FM.  It was the FM counterpart to AM 540 KWMT, simulcasting its country music and farm news programming.  Around 1970, it switched to an automated beautiful music format, later taking the call sign KKEZ.

In 1979, KKEZ changed from beautiful music to contemporary hit radio (Top 40) as "Fort Dodge's Hit Radio 94, KKEZ." The station became branded as "Z94" by veteran Iowa programmer Jim Davis in 1986. In the early 1990s, the station changed its brand to Adult Contemporary as "Mix 94.5" until it went Soft Adult Contemporary in January 2009.

In 2007, the KWMT and KKEZ were acquired by Clear Channel Communications, a forerunner to iHeartMedia.  iHeart later sold to Alpha Media.  On July 31, 2009, the station reverted to its Adult Contemporary format while keeping the "Mix 94.5" name.

References

External links
KKEZ website
Three Eagles Communications

KEZ
Hot adult contemporary radio stations in the United States
Fort Dodge, Iowa
Radio stations established in 1979
1979 establishments in Iowa